Guǵakovo is a village in the Municipality of Prilep.

It was also known as Godjakovo during the Kingdom of Serbia.

References

Villages in Prilep Municipality